The University of Santo Tomas Education High School, popularly known as UST-EHS or UST Educ High, is a laboratory school for the training and formation of future Catholic teachers.

History

The Education High School (EHS) is a separate institution from the UST High School. EHS was established to give quality Catholic education to those deserving students who cannot afford to pay the fees required by other schools. It also serves as the training ground for fourth year BSE students of the UST College of Education. This laboratory school was established during the time of Rector Magnificus Rev. Fr. Angel De Blas, O.P. through the help of the Dean of the College of Education, Rev. Fr. Aurelio Valbuena and Mrs. Caridad Sevilla, the EHS principal, and the different critic teachers of the College of Education. Classes commenced on August 1, 1950

A number of faculty members from the college comprised the first set of critic teachers for the different subject areas in the EHS. They were: Mercedes G. Santamaria, Clemencia J. Colayco, Rosario D. Bondoc, Concepcion Leonor, Antonia P. Villanueva, Consuel Perdices

The first regular teachers were Concepcion Alba, Rosario Mauricio, Lourdes Z. Sevilla and Teresita R. Villamil.

There were 361 students in the first enrollment of the EHS. There were 10 sections in the first year, 2 sections for the second year and 2 for third year. Half of those sections were attended in the morning by girls, half in the afternoon by boys.

References

Educational institutions established in 1950
1950 establishments in the Philippines
Catholic secondary schools in Manila
University of Santo Tomas
Laboratory schools in the Philippines
University-affiliated schools in the Philippines
Education in Sampaloc, Manila